Johnny Thunder is the name of three superheroes appearing in comics published by DC Comics. A fourth character has the variant name Jonni Thunder.

The character appeared in the second season of Stargirl on The CW network played by Ethan Embry.

Publication history
Johnny Thunder first appeared in Flash Comics #1 (January 1940) and was created by John Wentworth and Stan Aschmeier. In the first few issues, the title of the feature was Johnny Thunderbolt. He continued in Flash Comics until issue #91 (Jan 1948).

Fictional character biography

Earth-Two version
John L. Thunder is the seventh son of a seventh son, born at 7 a.m. on Saturday, July 7, the seventh day of the week, the seventh day of the seventh month in 1917. This causes him to be kidnapped by "some brown men" and sold to a group of men from the fictional country of Badhnesia who had been looking for someone born at this time on this day.

As an infant, the blond-haired Johnny is given possession of the pink, lightning-haired genie-like Thunderbolt named Yz during a mystic ritual on his 7th birthday, which was intended to allow the Badhnesians to use Johnny to rule the world. However, the plan is soon aborted after an attack from a neighboring country.

Johnny eventually returns to the United States and lives an ordinary life until one day, while washing windows, he inadvertently summons the Thunderbolt with the magic words "Cei-U" (pronounced "say you") when he calls for someone to throw him a sponge, which he accidentally uses to become a successful boxer. Johnny underwent several adventures (each time inadvertently summoning the Thunderbolt via the use of "say, you" in his day-to-day conversation, never realizing the Thunderbolt, who moved so fast he was virtually invisible, was responsible for the extraordinary events that befell him) before finally learning of the Thunderbolt's existence. In issue #11, he finally notices the Thunderbolt, and figures out the magic word in issue #20.

Johnny lived with his parents, dated his on-again, off-again girlfriend Daisy Darling (who had a somewhat less-than-scrupulous businessman father). In 1941, he adopted a little freckle-faced blond orphan girl named Peachy Pet, who, despite her cutesy name and clothing, was a tough little girl who was much smarter than her new father. Many times during his adventures, which included a stint with the United States Navy, Peachy would instruct her befuddled but beloved "Papa John" on how and when to use the Thunderbolt's magic powers.

The green-suit-and-red-bow tie-clad Johnny's appearances with the Justice Society of America and in his own solo adventures tended to be quite comedic, as Johnny's main personality trait was being fairly dimwitted, which prompts his much-smarter Thunderbolt to possess a sarcastic (if patient) attitude toward his "boss", while knowing full well that he could not actually do anything until his master told him to.

Johnny accidentally joined the Justice Society when wishing out loud that he could be a member and was immediately taken to their meeting by the Thunderbolt. Despite recurring impatience with his stupidity, his fellow JSAers genuinely valued Johnny's good-heartedness and dedication and considered him a friend. Furthermore, the Thunderbolt's vast power may have contributed to Johnny's continued JSA membership, his frequent blunders notwithstanding, since the more competent heroes doubtlessly thought it wise to keep an eye on the pair whenever possible. He finally became a member after the Flash left and the group told him to capture Mister X, which he accidentally succeeded in doing. Like most of the JSA members, he had his aging factor greatly slowed during an encounter with the villain Ian Karkull.

Johnny's adventures ceased in the late 1940s when he was replaced in the Justice Society stories by a heroine he had begun teaming up with, the Black Canary. The reason for his leaving the Justice Society is eventually explained to be that his control over his Thunderbolt is weakening, thanks to a spell cast by renegade Badhnesian priests. In the early 1950s, Johnny is kidnapped again by agents from Badhnesia, with the intention of executing their original world conquest plan. Johnny manages to summon Superman, and the would-be conquerors' plans are defeated. Johnny spent some time in Badhnesia afterwards, teaching the native citizens about democracy. He returns home after the country elects its first President. Johnny joins the Justice Society on various adventures.

Crisis on Infinite Earths and Ragnarök
Following the maxiseries Crisis on Infinite Earths was the one-shot Last Days of the Justice Society of America Special (1986). This book depicted the sacrifice of Johnny and his JSA teammates as they left the 'new' Post-Crisis world and entered into a Limbo dimension. Caused by the actions of Adolf Hitler in April 1945, a wave of destruction appears over Earth even as it is settling down from the Crisis. To stop a literal Ragnarök, the heroes enter into an eternal battle and so leave the world.

Earth-One version
Prior to the Crisis on Infinite Earths retcon, an alternate version of Johnny Thunder existed on Earth-One. This version was a simple petty criminal with no Thunderbolt. Upon meeting the Earth-Two Thunder (who had traveled to Earth-One out of curiosity), the criminal Johnny Thunder knocked his counterpart out and seized control of the Thunderbolt. He uses it to temporarily reshape Earth-One such that several heroes, such as Superman, Batman, and Green Lantern, retroactively cease to exist. The criminal exploits the fact that the Thunderbolt is 'keyed' to simply obey Johnny Thunder, without any distinction made between alternate versions, leaving the Thunderbolt obligated to obey whichever Johnny is conscious despite his own morality; however, the Thunderbolt often tries to work in loopholes to give the heroes an advantage, such as informing the criminal that the Justice Society—who had come to Earth-1 to find out what had happened to their friends in the Justice League——had disappeared, when they had, in fact, disguised themselves as the Justice League to provoke Johnny into revealing what had happened to their version, or making a barrier which keeps out cops, but not superheroes. The Earth-2 Johnny is apparently placed in a coma by the Thunderbolt's magic, though this is not actually shown.

The alternate version of Earth-One that Johnny creates is sometimes referred to as Earth-A (Earth Alternate), which Johnny thinks up himself. Thunder's 'Lawless League' of evil people with powers like the Justice League heroes, which are made up of Johnny's fellow criminals who were given the powers of the Justice League members, are defeated by the visiting Justice Society of Earth-Two, who had originally disguised themselves as the JLA, after learning of Johnny's disappearance, the Society's greater experience allowing them to easily defeat their criminal counterparts. They subsequently face off against Johnny Thunder on the Moon, and the three creatures that the Thunderbolt creates, Medusa-Man (who turns people into wood), Absorbo-Man (who can absorb the powers of others), and Repello-Man (who throws attacks back at their origins). All of the members are defeated, except for Doctor Fate. He creates a golden mask over Medusa-Man's face, and sends the wooden Mr. Terrific and Atom at Absorbo-Man, who had absorbed Green Lantern's power, meaning he is vulnerable to wood and is destroyed. He uses repello-magic on Repello-Man, which is repelled and destroys him. When the fight comes down to a struggle between Doctor Fate and the Thunderbolt, Johnny Thunder is so battered about by the combatting magic wielders - whose powers fail to do any actual damage to each other - that he finally gives up his attempts to use the Thunderbolt and wishes that none of these events had taken place. The two Earths and their respective heroes are restored, with the Justice League mentioning their world's Johnny Thunder as a small-time criminal at their meeting. The Johnny Thunder of Earth-One would return as a threat in Justice League of America #219-220.

Johnny's return
The absence of the JSA and of Johnny Thunder did not last long. In 1992 DC published Armageddon: Inferno, the miniseries which brought the JSA out of Limbo and into the Post-Crisis world. This was followed by Justice Society of America (1992–1993). This series showed how the heroes were adjusting to a 'normal' life. Johnny is depicted as an overweight man, not as old as his friends, but nostalgic for the past. It is explained that before he had entered into Limbo, he had lent his foster daughter a few thousand dollars and during his time fighting for the universe, she had created Peachy's Frozen Yogurt, a very successful chain of which Johnny is half owner and now very wealthy. Of greater import to Johnny is his discovery that the Bahdnesians have all but disappeared. A visit to the island of Bahdnesia (now under the ownership of Pol St. Germain) proves that no Bahdnesians are left there. In issue #7, Johnny states: "There were never very many of them...and the island magic had worn out. T-Bolt was all that was left, and he was with me in limbo. They had to leave or starve to death". This series also introduced the young Kiku, according to the Thunderbolt, the last remaining Bahdnesian.

After this, Johnny is depicted as suffering from symptoms of dementia. At one point, he loses track of a pen in which the Thunderbolt is being stored. The pen eventually ends up in the ownership of a young African American boy named Jakeem Williams, who takes up the name Johnny Jakeem Thunder or Jakeem Thunder.

Johnny Thunderbolt
In a later battle with Solomon Grundy, Jakeem unwittingly cures Johnny Thunder of his Alzheimer's. Unfortunately, Johnny immediately falls prey to the Ultra-Humanite, who takes over Johnny's body to command the Thunderbolt's powers. In the "Stealing Thunder" storyline, Jakeem is one of several heroes left free from the Ultra-Humanite's control. Eventually, Jakeem wrests control of the Thunderbolt back from the Ultra-Humanite, but Johnny Thunder loses his life. Jakeem then wishes that the Thunderbolt could save Johnny somehow, so the genie chooses to merge with Johnny, creating a new being with the memories of both. He later assumes the name Johnny Thunderbolt.

Johnny Thunderbolt bears Johnny's likeness, though it is not clear how the personalities of Johnny and the two genies interact, and whether any one personality is dominant. Johnny's family is informed of his death and a funeral is held at Valhalla, a cemetery for superheroes. The family does not know that he lives on as the Thunderbolt. The Thunderbolt eventually stops displaying Johnny's likeness while still speaking as him.

During the Blackest Night storyline, Johnny Thunder's body is reanimated as part of the Black Lantern Corps.

DC Rebirth
When Wally West was looking for someone to tether him to the universe again as seen in the DC Rebirth reboot, he comes to a retirement home called the Good Life Rest Home where a now-elderly Johnny Thunder tries to reconnect to the Justice Society, who have been lost since Joseph McCarthy had him reveal his secret and he had lost the Thunderbolt in the periods since. He tried to tell others who he was, but many think that he is crazy. When Wally comes to him to find the Justice Society, he disappears asking him to find the Justice Society. Believing that he was his old ally, Johnny tearfully calls out to him, apologizing for "throwing (him) away" in the past. Johnny Thunder is seen climbing on a rooftop of a home for the elderly shouting "Where are you Thunderbolt?" and calls him (the Thunderbolt) to come back to him. He is later found by two men: presumably workers at the house. They ask him how did he get there and forcefully pull him from the edge of the roof, saving him from lightning that struck the place that he stood on. He shouts at them that they "can't keep me locked up" and struggles to get free of them. they say he "has got a lot of a fight for a ninety-year-old" and drag him into the building. On the way into the building, he says that "The lightning says we need to find my friends" and "We lost the Justice Society" and "It's all my fault", to which they reply with disbelief, saying "Sure it did" and "Tell the nurse to up his meds".

During the 2018-2019 miniseries Doomsday Clock, Johnny Thunder is seen at his retirement home staring out the window while waiting for his family to take him out to dinner. They do not show up. Later that night, Thunder escapes from the retirement home as one of the orderlies claims that he will not get far. He heads to an old steel mill, where he is assaulted by a group of thieving junkies, but he is saved by Saturn Girl and Rorschach (Reggie Long). Johnny Thunder finds Alan Scott's Green Lantern power battery. Rorschach asks Johnny Thunder what that Lantern is. Rorschach, Saturn Girl and Johnny Thunder meet up with Ozymandias at the Owlship. Using Ozymandias' pet lynx Bubastis (revealed to have been cloned from the original Bubastis that Doctor Manhattan disintegrated and containing a sliver of his power) and the Lantern Battery, Ozymandias transports everyone to Doctor Manhattan's location at the Joker's "fun house" where Comedian is. After the confrontation with Doctor Manhattan, the injured Ozymandias makes it back to the Owlship, attacking Johnny and Saturn Girl, declaring that he can save everything and everyone. Ozymandias has Johnny Thunder and Saturn Girl imprisoned in his hideout. When Saturn Girl fades upon no longer being part of the current timeline, Ozymandias leaves as Johnny Thunder mourns Saturn Girl's disappearance and Alan Scott's Green Lantern is shown near him. When Doctor Manhattan undoes the experiment that erased the Justice Society of America and the Legion of Super-Heroes, Johnny Thunder finds himself merged with Thunderbolt as Johnny Thunderbolt and helps Superman defeat the forces of Black Adam.

Jakeem later encounters the Teen Titans after Djinn is forced by her brother Elias to summon Johnny Thunderbolt. Elias attacks Johnny Thunderbolt and tears an artifact known as the Stone of Souls from within its body, rendering Jakeem powerless. When the Titans nearly die while trying to save Djinn, Jakeem discovers that some of Johnny Thunderbolt's power is within his body, and is able to save the young heroes. After Elias' defeat, Djinn restores Johnny Thunderbolt and leaves with Jakeem to explore her newfound freedom.

In the pages of "The New Golden Age", Johnny Thunder was seen in 1940 about to prepare a group photo of the Justice Society. When a Huntress from a possible future ends up sent back in time to 1940, her unconscious body was found by Johnny Thunder and Thunderbolt. Johnny Thunder and Thunderbolt were present when Huntress meets the Justice Society. Johnny Thunder reminded Thunderbolt that they met someone from the future called Legionnaire when refreshing his memory. As Doctor Fate tries to read Huntress' mind about the threat in her future, Johnny Thunder and Thunderbolt were among those knocked down by the magical feedback.

Variants

Jonni Thunder

Jonni Thunder is the name of a fictional character and superhero appearing in comics published by DC Comics. She was a rebooted variant of Johnny Thunder and is commonly assisted by a new Thunderbolt.

Publication history
Jonni Thunder first appeared in a four-issue miniseries from 1985 named Jonni Thunder aka Thunderbolt, written by Roy Thomas.  In the first few issues, the title of the feature was Johnny Thunderbolt. Since she was created by Golden Age expert Roy Thomas and appeared with the descendants of the original JSA in Infinity Inc., a potential connection to Johnny Thunder seemed likely, but was never expounded upon. Jonni existed on Earth-Two before Crisis and is briefly seen on the merged Earth resulting from the Crisis, attending a detectives' convention.

Fictional character biography
Jonni Thunder is a female private detective. A small gold statue gives her the power to turn into a human thunderbolt, while leaving her body behind. First described as "a stone once struck by the hand of Apu Illapu, the Inca lightning god", the thunderbolt is revealed in later issues of Infinity, Inc. to be a hostile alien energy-being, who is defeated by being re-imprisoned in the statue, leaving Jonni without powers.

Other versions
In the Kingdom Come continuity, she and Black Lightning have a child who becomes the antihero Lightning, possessing the electricity-based powers of both of her parents. However, in the contemporary DC Universe, Black Lightning's daughter Lightning, who recently joined the JSA, is identified as the daughter of Black Lightning and his ex-wife Lynn Stewart.

In 2011, The New 52 rebooted the DC Comics universe and the history of characters related to the Golden Age of Comics has been drastically altered. A new version of Jonni Thunder is introduced on the parallel world of Earth 2 and appeared in the miniseries Earth 2: Worlds End. This version is seemingly possessed by the Thunderbolt which grants her electrical abilities and a multi-armed appearance similar to a Hindu goddess where she is described as a "lass with a powerful friend". Jonni Thunder was imprisoned at Arkham Base with Brainwave, Karnevil, and Obsidian. She is part of a team of heroes recruited by the mage John Constantine in his attempt to return to his own world of Prime Earth.

Reception
Brian Cronin of Comic Book Resources placed her series as part of failed reboots that are way better than the original explaining that "Thomas and Giordano managed to do a well-done comic detective series, which is no small feat".

Son of Johnny Thunder (Will Power of Primal Force)
William Twotrees is the illegitimate son of 1940s hero Johnny Thunder and a Jicarilla Apache woman. Afraid of prejudices against mixed marriages, Johnny abandoned his son, something he later regretted deeply. However, it seems as if Johnny's partner, the magic Thunderbolt named Yz, left his mark on young William, who developed astonishing Thunderbolt powers of his own later in his life. As Will Power, William joined the supernatural/metahuman team of heroes called the Leymen (a.k.a. Primal Force) until it was disbanded. He was last seen searching for his father, touring with a rock band as a "human light show".

Twotrees has neither reappeared since the cancellation of the Primal Force series, nor has he been referenced in any way in any of the later Justice Society of America titles.

In other media
 Johnny Thunder makes non-speaking appearances in Justice League Unlimited as a member of an expanded Justice League.
 Johnny Thunder appears in Stargirl, portrayed by an uncredited actor in season one and by Ethan Embry in season two. This version was a member of the Justice Society of America before the team was attacked by the Injustice Society of America, during which Johnny was killed by Brainwave while Thunderbolt was trapped in his pen for over 10 years. In the episode "Summer School: Chapter Three", Pat Dugan's son Mike temporarily gets ahold of Johnny's pen before it eventually ends up in his friend Jakeem Williams' hands.

See also
 Jakeem Thunder

References

Golden Age superheroes
DC Comics male superheroes
DC Comics fantasy characters
DC Comics characters who use magic
Earth-Two
Fictional characters from Arizona
Fictional characters who can manipulate reality
Fictional genies
Fictional private investigators
Comics characters introduced in 1940